Kasékò is a musical genre from French Guiana. It also designates the drums as well as the dance of this musical genre. This is a fusion of African, European and American styles.

Like gwo ka and bélé, Kasékò from French Guiana is also a rhythm and a dance and is played with 3 drums and a Ti-bwa.

Etymology 
The Guianan Creole term Kasékò derives from the French expression casser le corps (break the body) which was used during slavery in French Guiana to indicate a swift dance.

History

Origin 
Kasékò is an autogenic music based on the traditional dances of African slaves and mixed with European and Amerindian cultural contributions.

Instruments  
The Kasékò is played with four instruments :
 Tibwa or ti-bwa ;
 Three "tanbou" (drum) :
 Tanbou foulé or foulé kasékò,
 Tanbou koupé or dékoupé,
 Tanbou plonbé or foulé fon.

References

External links
http://kaseko.fr/Index.htm

French Guianan music
Kasékò